Auditory Verbal UK (AVUK) is a charity that delivers auditory-verbal therapy (AVT) to deaf babies and children aged 0 – 5 years to enable them to listen and talk.  Auditory Verbal therapists at AVUK work with families who want their child to develop oral communication. They equip parents and carers with the skills and strategies on a one-to-one basis to help their child develop their listening, talking, thinking and social skills.  

AVUK was founded in 2003 by Jacqueline Stokes in Oxfordshire to provide AV therapy for families in the UK. AVUK wants to raise expectations and outcomes for deaf children. They work to increase awareness, understanding and access to Auditory Verbal therapy by providing services directly to families and sharing their expertise with health and education professionals through their internationally accredited training programme, short courses, in-service training and webinars, so that many more families can access Auditory Verbal therapy close to where they live. The charity has two centres one in Bicester, Oxfordshire and one in Bermondsey, London but also provides telepractice sessions so that families can access support directly from their homes and professionals can train in Auditory Verbal practice from their workplace or their home.

In 2020, AVUK was chosen from more than 400 charities as one of 10 recipients of the  2020 GSK IMPACT Awards. The award recognises AVUK's significant impact in the community and commitment to helping deaf children to listen and learn alongside their hearing peers. The awards are designed to recognise the outstanding work of small and medium sized charities working to improve health and wellbeing in communities across the UK.

References 

Deafness organizations
Charities based in Oxfordshire